The Troy Tigers (a.k.a. Troy Dodgers and Troy Trojans)  were a minor league baseball team, based in Troy, Alabama that played in the Alabama State League and its predecessor the Alabama–Florida League from 1936 to 1941. At that point the team moved to Tuskegee, Alabama and was briefly known as the Tuskegee Airmen before shutting down because of World War II. The Troy team reformed after the war in 1946 and lasted through 1949.

They were affiliated with the Cleveland Indians, Cincinnati Reds, Brooklyn Dodgers and Detroit Tigers.

External links
Baseball Reference

Brooklyn Dodgers minor league affiliates
Detroit Tigers minor league affiliates
Cleveland Guardians minor league affiliates
Cincinnati Reds minor league affiliates
Defunct Alabama State League teams
Defunct Alabama-Florida League teams
Professional baseball teams in Alabama
1936 establishments in Alabama
1949 disestablishments in Alabama
Baseball teams established in 1936
Baseball teams disestablished in 1949
Pike County, Alabama
Defunct baseball teams in Alabama
Alabama State League teams